State Route 97 (SR 97) is a  state highway that extends from near Highland Home in Crenshaw County to Lowndesboro in Lowndes County.

Route description
The southern terminus of SR 97 is located at an intersection with U.S. Route 331 (US 331) to the west of Lapine. From this point, the highway travels in a northwesterly direction to Davenport. From Davenport, the highway shares its right-of-way with US 31 for approximately  while traveling in a westerly direction. After splitting from US 31, it resumes its northwesterly track en route to Hayneville, before turning to the north towards its northern terminus at US 80 in Lowndesboro.

Major intersections

See also

References

097
Transportation in Crenshaw County, Alabama
Transportation in Montgomery County, Alabama
Transportation in Lowndes County, Alabama